Theodas (or Theudas) of Laodicea, was a Pyrrhonist philosopher and  physician of the Empiric school, in the 2nd century. He is mentioned by Diogenes Laërtius as being a native of Laodicea, a pupil of Antiochus of Laodicea, and a contemporary of Menodotus. A physician of this name is also quoted by Andromachus.

References

Sources
 

2nd-century Greek physicians
Roman-era Skeptic philosophers